Kerecis is an Icelandic company that uses fish skins to treat wounds. Fertram Sigurjonsson is the current chief executive officer (CEO) of Kerecis.

Kerecis has subsidiaries in Switzerland and the United States. It is based in Ísafjörður, Iceland.

In 2021, as per Morgunbladid report, the company was valued at more than 100 million euros. Kereceis also works on medical research with the US Armed Forces and provides the grafts to branches of the military.

History
Fertram Sigurjonsson observed in 2009 that the skin of the fish and qualities, which are similar to those of human skin, expedited the latter's regeneration, particularly in the case of acute or chronic wounds. Based on his discovery, he founded Kereceis in 2013.
	
In 2016, Omega3 Wound, a fish skin treatment developed by Kereceis, was approved by the US Food and Drug Administration.  In the same year, Kerecis established headquarters in Arlington, Virginia.

In 2019, Kerecis acquired Phytoceuticals AG, a Swiss company active in the life sciences sector, that has since changed its name to Kerecis AG. In the same year, Emerson Collective acquired a stake in Kerecis.

In 2020, Kerecis received an award given by Vaxtarsprotinn, a joint project of the Confederation of Icelandic Industries, the Confederation of Start-up Companies, Icelandic Research Center, and Reykjavík University.

In 2021, FDA approved Kerecis Omega3 SurgiBind, fish-skin for surgical use that is useful in plastic and reconstructive surgery.

References

Ísafjörður
Medical technology companies of Iceland
2010 establishments in Iceland